The Alabama Auto Show is held each year at the Birmingham Jefferson Convention Complex, in Birmingham, Alabama.

This event is organized by the Birmingham Automobile Dealers Association. Vehicles representing domestic and imported car and truck lines are on display across the exhibition halls at the BJCC.

The Suzuki Grand Vitara "Blizzard" Concept Car was introduced during the 2007 Show.

External links
Show site
Birmingham Jefferson Convention Complex

Auto shows in the United States
Culture of Birmingham, Alabama
Tourist attractions in Birmingham, Alabama